Orange Swirl is a 1998 album by instrumental rock solo artist Andy Timmons. The heavily Beatles/Elvis Costello-influenced disc features 12 original tunes and one Lennon/McCartney classic, "She's Leaving Home".

Track listing
 "Please Come Home"
 "State of Mind"
 "My Friend"
 "It's a Shame"
 "In His Arms"
 "Wherever You Are"
 "Nobody Cares About Julie"
 "Now That You've Been Gone"
 "Nothing You Can Do"
 "Feelings Change"
 "Homeless"
 "Leave It Alone"
 "Wish I Had a Lover"
 "Call My Name"

Personnel
 Andy Timmons - Guitars, & vocals
 Mike Daane - Bass
 Mitch Marine - Drums
 Dan Wojciechowski - drums (7,9,11)
 Greg Beck - percussion
 Mike Medina - percussion
 Cindy Horstman - harp(13).

External links
Andy Timmons' official website
Favored Nations' official website
InstruMentalCase.com's 2007 audio interview with Andy Timmons
History of Andy Timmons - Interview

1998 albums
Andy Timmons albums